Carinhoso is a Brazilian telenovela produced and broadcast by TV Globo. It premiered on 2 July 1973 and ended on 18 January 1974, with a total of 173 episodes. It's the twelfth "novela das sete" to be aired at the timeslot. It is created by Lauro César Muniz and directed by Daniel Filho with Walter Campos.

Cast

References

External links 
 

1973 telenovelas
TV Globo telenovelas
Brazilian telenovelas
1973 Brazilian television series debuts
1974 Brazilian television series endings
Portuguese-language telenovelas
Television shows set in Rio de Janeiro (city)